Alfonzo DeFord Davis (February 4, 1875 – February 7, 1919) was an American professional baseball outfielder. He played in Major League Baseball (MLB) from 1901 to 1907 for the Brooklyn Superbas, Pittsburgh Pirates, New York Highlanders, and Cincinnati Reds.

In 348 games over four seasons, Davis posted a .261 batting average (338-for-1296) with 232 runs, 3 home runs, 110 runs batted in, 65 stolen bases, and 167 bases on balls. He recorded a .940 fielding percentage in his major league career.

External links

1875 births
1919 deaths
Major League Baseball outfielders
Brooklyn Superbas players
Pittsburgh Pirates players
New York Highlanders players
Cincinnati Reds players
Mobile Blackbirds players
Detroit Tigers (Western League) players
Minneapolis Millers (baseball) players
Columbus Senators players
St. Paul Saints (AA) players
York Prohibitionists players
Winona Pirates players
Minor league baseball managers
Baseball players from Nashville, Tennessee